Oliver Filip (born 15 January 1998) is an Austrian football player who plays for Vorwärts Steyr.

Club career
He made his professional debut in the Austrian Football First League for FC Liefering on 26 February 2016 in a game against SKN St. Pölten.

On 13 June 2021, he moved to Vorwärts Steyr.

References

External links
 
 

1998 births
People from Leoben
Living people
Austrian footballers
Austria youth international footballers
Association football wingers
FC Liefering players
SK Sturm Graz players
WSG Tirol players
FC Blau-Weiß Linz players
SK Vorwärts Steyr players
Austrian Football Bundesliga players
2. Liga (Austria) players
Austrian Regionalliga players
Footballers from Styria